The 1960–61 WHL season was the ninth season of the Western Hockey League. The Portland Buckaroos were the Lester Patrick Cup champions as they beat the Seattle Totems four games to two in the final series. 

Lester Patrick died on June 1, 1960, and in honour of him the WHL voted to rename the championship trophy from the President's Cup to the Lester Patrick Cup.

The Portland Buckaroos joined the league, and the eight teams played in one division.

Lou Jankowski of Calgary set a league record with 57 goals, and was named most valuable player. Art Jones of Portland won the scoring title with 100 points, one more than Jankowski.

Final standings 

bold – qualified for playoffs

Playoffs

Playoff bracket

The final, between Portland and Seattle, was the first in league history to feature two American teams. The Portland Buckaroos defeated the Seattle Totems 4 games to 2 to win the Lester Patrick Cup.

References

Bibliography

 

Western Hockey League (1952–1974) seasons
1960–61 in American ice hockey by league
1960–61 in Canadian ice hockey by league